The 16th Arabian Gulf Cup was held in Kuwait, between 26 December 2003 to 11 January 2004. All matches were played Al-Sadaqua Walsalam Stadium. Yemen made their debut in the Arabian Gulf Cup.

Iraq continued to be banned from the tournament because of its invasion of Kuwait in 1990.

Result

Matches

Winners

References

External links 
 Official Site (Arabic)

Arabian Gulf Cup
International association football competitions hosted by Kuwait
Gulf Cup Of Nations, 2003
Gulf